Archaeoses polygrapha is a moth in the family Cossidae. It is found in Australia.

References

Natural History Museum Lepidoptera generic names catalog

Cossidae